Trailer Life is a magazine that reviews recreational vehicles, provides articles on travel trailers and towing as well a focus on the outdoors, recent trends and popular destinations.

History
Trailer Life was founded in July 1941 as Western Trailer Life, in California.  In 1958, Los Angeles advertising executive Art Rouse purchased the magazine. In 1992, Trailer Life Enterprises became part of the umbrella company Affinity Group Inc., since renamed Good Sam Enterprises.

References

External links
Trailer Life Magazine Website
Instagrammable Places In London

Lifestyle magazines published in the United States
Monthly magazines published in the United States
Caravans and travel trailers
Magazines established in 1941
Magazines published in California
Mass media in Ventura County, California
Tourism magazines